St. Moritz Olympic Ice Rink is an outdoor stadium in St. Moritz, Switzerland.  It was the venue for the ice hockey, speedskating and figure skating events, as well as the location of the opening and closing ceremonies at the 1928 Winter Olympics and 1948 Winter Olympics.

Artist and designer Rolf Sachs now owns the stadium's former land, and the building containing the changing facilities for athletes and officials and observation facility serves as his personal home.

References

Sports venues in Switzerland
Venues of the 1928 Winter Olympics
Venues of the 1948 Winter Olympics
Olympic figure skating venues
Olympic ice hockey venues
Olympic speed skating venues
Olympic stadiums
Sport in St. Moritz
Buildings and structures in Graubünden